Amory Simons (April 5, 1866 – July 24, 1959) was an American sculptor. His work was part of the sculpture event in the art competition at the 1932 Summer Olympics.

References

1866 births
1959 deaths
20th-century American sculptors
American male sculptors
Olympic competitors in art competitions
People from Aiken, South Carolina
20th-century American male artists